Wandsbek Markt is a rapid transit station on the Hamburg U-Bahn line U1 and an important interchange station between Hamburger Hochbahn (HHA) trains and buses. The station was opened in October 1961 and is located at Wandsbeker Marktplatz in the center of Wandsbek, Germany. Wandsbek is center of the Hamburg borough of Wandsbek.

History 

Until , it was a terminus station. The station was substantially renovated from 2000 until 2003, the bus terminal until 2005.

Service 
HVV runs one staffed service centre at Wandsbek Markt, along a number of sales points and ticket machines throughout the station.

Trains 
Wandsbek Markt is served by Hamburg U-Bahn line U1; departures are every 5 minutes.

Bus  
The central bus terminal (ZOB) is located on Wandsbeker Marktplatz, above the underground station. Among others, eight HHA transit bus lines, two express bus lines and three metro bus lines start at ZOB Wandsbek. At an average of some 50,000 passengers and 110 buses per hour, Wandsbek Markt is one of the largest bus terminals in Germany.

See also 

 List of Hamburg U-Bahn stations

References

External links 

 Line and route network plans at hvv.de 

Hamburg U-Bahn stations in Hamburg
Buildings and structures in Wandsbek
U1 (Hamburg U-Bahn) stations
Railway stations in Germany opened in 1961
1961 establishments in West Germany